David Jones is the debut studio album by English singer Davy Jones, released in 1965 by Colpix Records. Various mismatches on the original jackets/LP labels are worth noting for denotation of mono or stereo pressings. Runout matrix numbers beginning with M are mono pressings, making identification of the LP's actual format relatively easy.

Original album track listing

 "What Are We Going To Do?" (Henry Levine/Murray MacLeod/Smokey Roberds)
 "Maybe It's Because I'm a Londoner" (Hubert Gregg)
 "Put Me Amongst The Girls" (Clarence Wainwright Murphy/Dan Lipton, arranged by Henry Levine)
 "Any Old Iron" (Charles Collins/E.A. Sheppard/Fred E. Terry)
 "Theme For A New Love" (Berdie Abrams/Hank Levine)
 "It Ain't Me Babe" (Bob Dylan)
 "Face Up To It" (Roger Atkins/Gerry Robinson)
 "Dream Girl" (Van McCoy)
 "Baby It's Me" (Mark Anthony)
 "My Dad" (Barry Mann/Cynthia Weil)
 "This Bouquet" (Henry Levine/Murray MacLeod/Smokey Roberds)

2011 Friday Music reissue CD bonus tracks
 "Take Me to Paradise" (1965 single)
 "The Girl from Chelsea" (1965 single)

External links 
Discogs page

1965 debut albums
Davy Jones (musician) albums